Frank Sinatra: In Concert at the Royal Festival Hall was a BBC musical television special starring Frank Sinatra, recorded on 16 November 1970 at the Royal Festival Hall in London. Sinatra performed two full shows that evening and the second one was filmed. The programme was first broadcast in the UK on BBC Television, 22 November 1970, followed by CBS in America, 4 February 1971. The special was directed by Bill Miller, and produced by Harold Davison.

Sinatra was introduced on stage by Grace Kelly. Kelly had starred alongside Sinatra in High Society (1956), the last film she made before her marriage to Rainier III, Prince of Monaco.

Sinatra had been balding for many years, hence all the hats in publicity stills, album covers etc. TV directors were forbidden to photograph him from the back because of this. However, at this concert, Sinatra had completed a very successful hair transplant and deliberately turned his back on the main audience a couple of times to acknowledge the audience sitting at the rear of the stage, along with running his hand over the back of his head to draw attention to his new coiffure.

Set list
 "You Make Me Feel So Young"
 "Pennies from Heaven"
 "I've Got You Under My Skin"
”Something”
 "The Lady Is a Tramp
 "I Get Along Without You Very Well (Except Sometimes)"
 "Didn't We"
 "One For My Baby"
 "A Foggy Day" – edited from standalone home video releases; only on DVD in Sinatra: London box set
 "I Will Drink the Wine"
 "I Have Dreamed"
 "My Kind of Town"
 "My Way"

Personnel
 Bill Miller - Piano, Conductor
 Irv Cottler - Drums

External links

"A Foggy Day" official video of 'missing' performance on YouTube

References

1971 in American television
1971 television specials
CBS television specials
Frank Sinatra television specials
Music in London